Erismann is a surname. Notable people with the surname include:

Friedrich Erismann (1842–1915), Swiss ophthalmologist and hygienist 
Marianne Erismann (1930–2004), Swiss swimmer

See also
Eismann

Swiss-language surnames